Tazza may refer to:

Tazza (cup) (usually pronounced "tatza", plural usually "tazze"), from the Italian, a wide shallow cup or bowl, usually on a tall stem
Tajja, a South Korean manhwa (타짜), also transliterated as Tazza
Tazza (TV series), a 2008 South Korean television series based on the manhwa
Tazza: The High Rollers, a 2006 South Korean film based on the manhwa
Tazza: The Hidden Card, a 2014 South Korean film based on the manhwa
Tazza: One Eyed Jack, a 2019 South Korean film based on the manhwa

See also
Farnese Cup, an example of a tazza vessel
Aldobrandini Tazze, a set of 12 silver-gilt 16th-century tazze
Tazza d'Oro (Pittsburgh), a cafe in Pittsburgh
Donato Sbarretti (1856–1939), Roman Catholic Cardinal